Kireas is a former municipality in Euboea, Greece. Since the 2011 local government reform it is part of the municipality Mantoudi-Limni-Agia Anna, of which it is a municipal unit. The municipal unit has an area of 294.665 km2. Population 5,411 (2011). The seat of the municipality was in Mantoudi.

The name comes from Kireas River which flows from the mountains of Fteritsa, Pyxaria and Mavrovouni, joins with Neleus River finally flowing into the Aegean near the sea shore of Krya Vrysi in North Euboia. Strabo mentions a legend according to which sheep drinking from Kireas gave birth to white offspring while those drinking from Neleus gave birth to black. The sycamore forest in this Kireas' banks hosts the oldest and greatest in size tree in the Balkans, the "Μέγας Πλάτανος" (Great Sycamore).

Twin towns
Kireas is twinned with:
 Ürgüp, Turkey (since 2004)

References

Populated places in Euboea